Simon Hollingsworth (born 9 May 1972) is a former track and field athlete who was the CEO of the Australian Sports Commission from 2012 to 2016.

Athletic career

Hollingsworth competed nationally and internationally for Australia in the 400 metres hurdles. He participated in the 1992 and 1996 Olympic Games, the Commonwealth Games and World Athletics Championships.

Hollingsworth holds the record in the 400m hurdles at under 18 level with a time of 50.45 seconds.

Education

He studied at St Patrick's College, Launceston, and St Virgil's College, Hobart, before graduating from the University of Tasmania in 1996 with a combined degree of Bachelor of Commerce and Bachelor of Laws, achieving Honours in Law.

He was a Rhodes Scholar at Exeter College, Oxford where he studied Philosophy, Politics, and Economics.

Business career

Hollingsworth is a member of the Athletes commission and has acted as chairperson of the Commission since 2000.

He was an Executive Director in the Victorian Department of Premier and Cabinet before being appointed the CEO of the Australian Sports Commission on 27 September 2011. Hollingsworth resigned as CEO in August 2016 to take up a senior finance position in the Victorian Government.

Hollingsworth is currently the CEO of the Magistrates' Courts of Victoria.

National podiums
400 m hurdles
1993–94: third (49.68)
1994–95: runner-up (49.73)
1995–96: runner-up (50.12)

International competitions

References

External links
Under 18 record
Athletics Australia

1972 births
Living people
Australian male hurdlers
Australian Rhodes Scholars
Athletes (track and field) at the 1990 Commonwealth Games
Athletes (track and field) at the 1994 Commonwealth Games
Athletes (track and field) at the 1992 Summer Olympics
Athletes (track and field) at the 1996 Summer Olympics
Olympic athletes of Australia
Alumni of Exeter College, Oxford
People educated at St Virgil's College
Australian Institute of Sport track and field athletes
Australian sports executives and administrators
World Athletics Championships athletes for Australia
Commonwealth Games competitors for Australia